Papyrus 63 (in the Gregory-Aland numbering), designated by 𝔓63, is a copy of the New Testament in Greek. It is a papyrus manuscript of the Gospel of John. The surviving text of John are verses 3:14-18; 4:9-10. The manuscript paleographically had been assigned to the 4th century (or 5th century).

Text 
The Greek text of this codex is a representative of the Alexandrian text-type, but with some the Byzantine readings. Aland placed it in Category II.

 

 

In John 3:16 it has the textual variant  supported by the manuscript's second corrector of Sinaiticus (א2), A, L, Θ, Ψ, 063, 083, 086, 0113, f1, f13, Byz, Didache.

Location
The codex is currently housed at the Staatliche Museen zu Berlin (Inv. 11914) in Berlin.

See also 

 John 3, John 4
 List of New Testament papyri

References

Further reading 

 Otto Stegmüller, Zu den Bibelorakeln im Codex Bezae, Biblica 34 (1953), pp. 13–22.

External links 
 Digital image of P63 at CSNTM
 Papyrus 63 - images: Multiply.com

New Testament papyri
4th-century biblical manuscripts
Gospel of John papyri